Passage to Juneau: A Sea and Its Meanings is a 1999 travelogue by Jonathan Raban. Alongside an account of Raban's own trip by boat from Seattle to Juneau, the reader is presented with the voyage of Captain George Vancouver between 1792 and 1794 and his encounters with the seagoing natives living along the coast.

Sources 

 The New York Review of Books January 20, 2000 'Now Voyager' 
 New York Times, November 7, 1999 'Staying Afloat' 
 Powell.com Author interviews - Jonathan Raban 
 San Francisco Chronicle November 7, 1999 
 Review: A Solitary Voyage by David P. Stern (27 July 2002) 
 The Guardian, September 23, 2006, 'Rootless in Seattle, Aida Edemariam 

1999 British novels
Historical novels
Fiction set in the 1790s
British travel books
English non-fiction books
Pantheon Books books